Hothbrodd was a legendary Norse hero, details of whose life appear in several related variations.

In the legends of the Ylfing Helgi Hundingsbane, he was the son of king Granmar of Södermanland, and he was killed by Helgi.

The Chronicon Lethrense and included Annales Lundenses relate that Hother was the king of the Saxons and son of Hothbrod, whom Helghe had killed to win all of Denmark. Hother first slew Othen's (i.e. Odin) son Balder in battle and then chased Othen and Thor. Finally, Othen's son Both killed Hother. Hother, Balder, Othen and Thor were incorrectly considered to be gods.

In Gesta Danorum, Saxo Grammaticus has merged the Ylfing Helgi Hundingsbane with the Danish skjöldung king Helgi. He has also made Hothbrodd a king of Sweden and father of Höder and Adils.

In Hversu Noregr byggdist, Höddbrodd (Hǫdbroddr) was the son of a Höd. The name Höd is identical to that born by the slayer of the god Baldr in other tales. And while the Höd of the Hversu is said to be father of a son named Höddbrodd, in Saxo Grammaticus' Gesta Danorum (Book 3)  Høtherus, the slayer of Balderus, is the son of Hothbrodus or Hothbroddus.)

See also 

Mythological kings of Denmark
Mythological kings of Sweden
Heroes in Norse myths and legends